William Frederick Zimmerman (January 20, 1887 – October 4, 1952) was a professional baseball player. He was an outfielder in Major League Baseball for the 1915 Brooklyn Robins.

External links

1887 births
1952 deaths
Major League Baseball outfielders
Brooklyn Robins players
Lynn Shoemakers players
Jersey City Skeeters players
Clinton Champs players
Utica Utes players
Atlanta Crackers players
Newark Indians players
Rochester Hustlers players
Oakland Oaks (baseball) players
Worcester Chiefs players
Major League Baseball players from Germany
German emigrants to the United States